WELC (1150 kHz, "98.7 EZ-FM") is a soft adult contemporary formatted broadcast radio station licensed to Welch, West Virginia serving Welch and McDowell County, West Virginia. WELC is owned by First Media Services, LLC.

At midnight on January 1, 2020, the station flipped to soft adult contemporary as "98.7 EZ-FM", in simulcast with WKEZ 1240 AM Bluefield.

Previous logo

References

External links

ELC
ELC
Soft adult contemporary radio stations in the United States
Radio stations established in 1950
1950 establishments in West Virginia